Bagneux is a commune of the Allier department in the Auvergne-Rhône-Alpes region of central France.

The inhabitants of the commune are known as Bagnolais or Bagnolaises.

Geography
Access to the commune is by the D287 from Couzon in the west which goes to the village. The D101 comes from Aubigny in the north-west and passes through the commune and the village continuing south-east to Montilly. The D13 from Couzon to Montilly passes through the south-west of the commune. The D133 comes from Aurouër in the east and passes through the village before continuing south-west to Agonges. There are several hamlets in the commune: Les Amiel, Saligny, and Ray. There are large forests in the west of the commune with the eastern half mostly farmland.

The Allier river flows north-west along the eastern border of the commune although it does not correspond exactly to the border and small portions of the commune are on the right bank. Many streams rise in the commune and flow eastwards to join the Allier. There are also several small lakes in the commune, both natural and artificial, which feed the streams.

Neighbouring communes and villages

History
The Chateau of Belleperche, located on the territory of the commune, was besieged in 1370 during the Hundred Years War. Free companies of Gascon mercenaries and marauders working for the English seized it in 1369 and retained as prisoner the Dowager Duchess of Bourbon, Isabella de Valois. The castle was besieged by the troops of the Dukes of Bourbon and Burgundy. The "Free companies" were expelled, but they took the duchess with them as hostage.

Heraldry

Administration

List of Successive Mayors

Population

Sites and monuments
The Romanesque Church of Saint Paul (12th century) is registered as an historical monument. The Church contains three items that are registered as historical objects:
A Commemorative Plaque for the founding of Masses by Priest François Bouquereau (1679)
A Bronze Bell (1527)
A Processional Cross (13th century)
The Motte of the vanished fortified castle of Belleperche. This mound is at an altitude of 2,138 m south-east of the Church

Notable people linked to the commune
Isabella de Valois, Dowager Duchess of Bourbon, mother of Duke Louis II of Bourbon, held prisoner in Belleperche from 1369 to 1370.

See also
Communes of the Allier department

References

External links
Bagneux on the old National Geographic Institute website 
Bagneux on Géoportail, National Geographic Institute (IGN) website 
Bagneux on the 1750 Cassini Map

Communes of Allier